The 1996 Ohio State Buckeyes football team represented the Ohio State University in the 1996 NCAA Division I-A football season.  The team's head coach was John Cooper.  The Buckeyes played their home games in Ohio Stadium. The team finished the season with a win–loss record of 11–1, and a Big Ten Conference record of 7–1.  They were co-champions of Big Ten Conference with the Northwestern Wildcats and played in the 1997 Rose Bowl against Pacific-10 Conference champion the Arizona State Sun Devils. Ohio State did not play Northwestern during the regular season and were selected to play in the Rose Bowl due to their better overall record of 10–1 (the Wildcats were 9–2). Northwestern had played in the previous Rose Bowl.

The Buckeyes used two quarterbacks throughout the year, junior Stanley Jackson, and sophomore Joe Germaine, the Buckeyes were dominant throughout the majority of the season, outscoring their opponents by a score of 455–131. The Buckeyes only loss came late in the season to their rivals, the Michigan Wolverines, by a score of 13–9.

Because of the late loss, Ohio State fell from second to fourth in the polls.  Due to the Big Ten and Pac-10 not being involved in the Bowl Alliance agreement as the two champions were contractually obligated to play in the Rose Bowl, Ohio State was set to play #2 Arizona State, while #1 Florida State and #3 Florida played for the national championship in the 1997 Sugar Bowl.

Ohio State went into the 1997 Rose Bowl with high hopes and Germaine came off the bench and threw a late touchdown pass to David Boston to steal a come-from-behind victory. With the Buckeyes dramatic upset victory over the Sun Devils, Buckeye fans hoped for a share of the national title. However, Florida would later avenge a late season loss to their rivals, and beat the Seminoles by a score of 52–20. Florida finished first and Ohio State second in both polls, followed by Florida State and Arizona State.

The Rose Bowl appearance was the Buckeyes first since 1985. The Rose Bowl victory was the sixth in school history, the first since 1974. Germaine was named Rose Bowl MVP.

Schedule

Game summaries

Rice

Pittsburgh

Notre Dame

Penn State

Wisconsin

Purdue

Iowa

Minnesota

Illinois

Indiana

Michigan

Rose Bowl

Rankings

Roster

Coaching staff
 John Cooper - Head Coach - 9th year
 Bill Conley - Defensive Ends, Recruiting Coordinator (10th year)
 Walt Harris - Quarterbacks (2nd year)
 Jim Heacock - Defensive Line (1st year)
 Joe Hollis - Offensive Coordinator (6th year)
 Mike Jacobs - Offensive Line (2nd year)
 Fred Pagac - Defensive Coordinator, Linebackers (15th year)
 Tim Spencer - Running Backs (3rd year)
 Chuck Strobart - Wide Receivers (2nd year)
 Jon Tenuta - Defensive Backs (1st year)

Depth chart

Q

Awards and honors
Andy Katzenmoyer, Big Ten Freshman of the Year

1997 NFL draftees

References

Ohio State
Ohio State Buckeyes football seasons
Big Ten Conference football champion seasons
Rose Bowl champion seasons
Ohio State Buckeyes football